Charles Louis Bretagne de La Trémoille (15 March 1683 – 9 October 1719), 6th duke of Thouars, was the son of Charles Belgique Hollande de La Trémoille and Madeleine de Créquy, daughter and heiress of Charles III de Créquy.

He became duke of Thouars upon his father's death in 1709. He was also count of Laval and Montfort and inherited the ancient French claim to the Kingdom of Naples. The Neapolitan claim gave the family the rank of princes étrangers at the French court. The Duke made a career in the military as well as at Versailles: he was brigadier of cavalry (January 1709), first gentleman of the King's chamber (June 1709), governor of Thouars (July 1709),  and Maréchal de camp (February 1719).

His sister Marie Armande Victoire de La Trémoille married Emmanuel Théodose de La Tour d'Auvergne.

On 13 April 1706 he married Marie-Madeleine Motier de La Fayette (1691–1717), the daughter of Rene-Armand, marquis de La Fayette and Marie-Madeleine de Marillac, and granddaughter of the author Marie-Madeleine Pioche de la Vergne, comtesse de la Fayette.  They had one child, Charles Armand René de La Trémoille, born in 1708.

Ancestry

References 

Sources
 Georges Paul, Dr Pierre Balme et Marie-Louise Le Verrier, Une grande famille d'Auvergne Les Motier de La Fayette, imprimerie de Bussac, parution en 1951.

 Endnote:
For a detailed genealogy of the family and its alliances see Louis Moréri, Dictionnaire historique: Annuaire de la noblesse française (1856 and 1867).

1683 births
1719 deaths
Charles Louis Bretagne
Dukes of La Trémoille
Dukes of Thouars
17th-century French people
18th-century French people
People of Byzantine descent
18th-century peers of France